The 1985 Philippine Basketball Association (PBA) rookie draft was an event at which teams drafted players from the amateur ranks.

Round 1

Round 2

Round 3

Round 4

Round 5

Undrafted players
Ramon Aquino
Jerome Cueto
Ramon Cui
Artemio Gancayco
Jesus Ramirez
Rodel Sy
Ramon Samson

References

Philippine Basketball Association draft
draft